Wierzbie may refer to the following places:
Wierzbie, Lesser Poland Voivodeship (south Poland)
Wierzbie, Łódź Voivodeship (central Poland)
Wierzbie, Lublin Voivodeship (east Poland)
Wierzbie, Świętokrzyskie Voivodeship (south-central Poland)
Wierzbie, Greater Poland Voivodeship (west-central Poland)
Wierzbie, Silesian Voivodeship (south Poland)
Wierzbie, Nysa County in Opole Voivodeship (south-west Poland)
Wierzbie, Olesno County in Opole Voivodeship (south-west Poland)